The Division of Calare is an Australian electoral division in the state of New South Wales.

Geography
Since 1984, federal electoral division boundaries in Australia have been determined at redistributions by a redistribution committee appointed by the Australian Electoral Commission. Redistributions occur for the boundaries of divisions in a particular state, and they occur every seven years, or sooner if a state's representation entitlement changes or when divisions of a state are malapportioned.

History

The division was first contested at the 1906 election; created to replace the abolished Division of Canobolas, and is named for the local Aboriginal name for the Lachlan River, which runs through the western part of the division. The Aboriginal name is pronounced Kal-ah-ree, but the pronunciation Kul-air is established for the division.

The division originally encompassed Forbes, Orange and Parkes. Subsequent boundary changes moved it eastwards to encompass Bathurst, Lithgow and Oberon. On these boundaries it was notionally a marginal seat between the Australian Labor Party (which held it 1983–96) and the National Party, but it was held comfortably by an independent, Peter Andren, from 1996 to 2007. Andren was not a candidate for the 2007 election: he intended to run for a Senate seat but was diagnosed with cancer in 2007 and died during the election campaign.

A redistribution in 2006 moved the boundaries west to take in Cowra, Grenfell and the vast north-west of New South Wales from Brewarrina to Menindee, making Calare New South Wales's largest electorate. Lithgow, Bathurst and Oberon, which tend to favour Labor, were transferred to the neighbouring seat of Macquarie. At the 2007 federal election, Calare was won by the Nationals' representative John Cobb on a margin of 12.1 percent. Cobb had previously represented the Division of Parkes, parts of which were redistributed into Calare in 2006.

The 2009 redistribution of NSW moved the boundaries back east, to again include Lithgow, Bathurst and Oberon. Most of the northwestern area of the division was transferred to the neighbouring Division of Parkes.  The changes took effect at the 2010 election.

The division currently stretches from Mudgee, Gulgong, Dubbo, Wellington in the north-west, to Orange, Bathurst, Lithgow and Oberon in the south-east and Canowindra in the south-west.

The current Member for Calare, since the 2016 federal election, is Andrew Gee, an Independent member who was originally elected as a member of the National Party.

Members

Election results

References

External links
 Division of Calare – Australian Electoral Commission

Electoral divisions of Australia
Constituencies established in 1906
1906 establishments in Australia